Schwabinger Bach is a stream in Bavaria, Germany. It starts in the centre of Munich, flows through the Englischer Garten and flows into the Isar near Garching bei München.

Photos

See also
List of rivers of Bavaria

References

Rivers of Bavaria
Rivers of Germany